S.E.S. Best is a greatest hits album released in 2002 by S.E.S. Though it compiles their Korean-language singles (excluding "Show Me Your Love", "Just In Love", and "Just A Feeling"), the album was released only in Japan.

Track listing
 Requiem
 Slip Away
 Love
 Just A Feeling (Original Version)
 Be Natural
 Feeling
 Someone To Feel
 Dreams Come True
 I Will...
 U
 Silver
 ('Cause) I'm Your Girl
 Red Angel
 Twilight Zone
 Oh, My Love
 Good Bye To My Love
 Eternal Love
 Just A Feeling (New Generation Remix)

External links 
  S.E.S.' Official Site
  SM Entertainment's Official Site

2002 greatest hits albums
S.E.S. (group) albums